Cybertron may refer to:

A fictional planet, the homeworld of the Transformers and the planet form of their creator Primus
The English dub name for "Tobikage", a small robotic ninja in the TV series Ninja Senshi Tobikage
The Japanese name for the Autobot faction from the Transformers multimedia franchise
The Japanese name for the Maximal faction from Beast Wars: Transformers
A fictional robot in the TV series SWAT Kats: The Radical Squadron
The original title for the show VR Troopers
An experimental learning machine (computer) developed by Raytheon Company in early 1960s to analyze sonar, electrocardiograms and speech, equipped with a "goof" button to correct its mistakes

See also
Cybotron (disambiguation)
Cybertron Mission, a 1984 video game
Transformers: Cybertron, a Transformers series known as Transformers: Galaxy Force in Japan
Transformers: War for Cybertron
Cyberon